Rape in the Philippines is considered a criminal offense. In Philippine jurisprudence, it is a heinous crime punishable by reclusión perpetua when committed against women. Rape of males is also legally recognized as rape by sexual assault, which is penalized by imprisonment of six to twelve years.

Law

The Anti-Rape Law of 1997 (which amended the previous definition of rape as defined in the Revised Penal Code of 1930) defines the crime of rape as follows:

Changes in 1997 expanded the definition of rape and reclassified that crime as a Crime against persons instead of, as previously, grouping it with Crimes against Chastity. The amendment also recognized the rape of males, both by other males and by females, as well as that both the victim and rapist may either be male or female. Prior to the 1997 amendment of Revised Penal Code of 1930, male victims of rape were not acknowledged under Philippine law. Article 266-A of the law defines rape by "an act of sexual assault" by any person either by "inserting his penis into another person's mouth or anal orifice" or inserting "any instrument or object, into the genital or anal orifice of another person".The 1997 amendment allowed the legal recognition of rape of males, both by other males and by females. However rape against males are only considered by law as rape by sexual assault, which carries a lesser penalty of 6 to 12 years as opposed to the same act against females which are penalized by life imprisonment.

The María Clara doctrine is a relevant legal doctrine that observed by Philippine courts on abuse on women, including rape. It states that women, especially Filipino women, "would not admit that they have been abused unless that abuse had actually happened." and that a women's natural instinct is to protect their honor. Though in 2018, a ruling which convicted two men for rape of a woman in Davao City was reversed by the Supreme Court's Third Division due to inconsistencies with the woman's statement in regards to her alleged rape and other evidences presented to the court. However this did not mean the abandonment of the doctrine contrary to speculations by critics of the ruling.

Since rape is punishable by reclusión perpetua, Article 90 of the Revised Penal Code provides a statute of limitations of 20 years from the date of its commission.

Statistics

Statistics on the incidence of rape are usually based on available police records. Often, these are inaccurate and not a true representation of the problem, 
In the Philippines, The Asian Women's Resource Exchange (AWORC), an Internet-based women's information service, reports that 794 rapes occurred in the Philippines in the first four months of 1997.
 During the first semester of 1999 alone, there were 2,393 children who fell prey to rape, attempted rape, incest, acts of lasciviousness and prostitution.

In 2006, rape continued to be a problem, with most cases going unreported. During the year, the PNP reported 685 rape cases. There were reports of rape and sexual abuse of women in police or protective custody—often women from marginalized groups, such as suspected prostitutes, drug users, and lower income individuals arrested for minor crimes.
. The situation continued in 2007, with the number of reported rape cases increasing to 879.

Occurrences

Women in custody
Women in the custody of law enforcement officials in the Philippines are vulnerable to torture, including rape and sexual abuse.
Between 1995 and 2000 Amnesty International received reports of more than 30 incidents of rape or other sexual abuse of women or girls in custody. The organization fears that this figure represents only a fraction of the real number of cases.
Rape of women detainees by police officers, jail guards or military officials always constitutes torture. It is both a physical violation and injury as well as a humiliating assault on a woman's mental and emotional integrity.
Other forms of sexual abuse by law enforcement officials, including the threat of rape, verbal sexual abuse, and mocking, designed to degrade and humiliate, may also constitute torture or other forms of cruel, inhuman and degrading treatment. According to Amnesty International's information, there has been only a small number of convictions of police officers for the rape of female detainees.

In prostitution
Prostitution in the cities of Olongapo and Angeles was highly prominent during the time of the U.S. military bases called Subic Bay Naval Base and Clark Air Base, respectively.

Although the sex trade in the Philippines mostly caters to the indigenous population, NGOs and religious groups regularly sensationalize the problems of prostitution by drawing attention to the foreigner-oriented segment of this business. In Angeles, the control is split between Filipino, Korean, Australian and American bar operators, though in 1987, Australians had a financial interest in more than 60% of the 500 bars and 7,000 prostitutes in the city

Philippines Senator Ramon Bong Revilla, Jr., on July 26, 2006, called for coordination with the Philippine National Police vis-a-vis the public, the whistle blower and anti-prostitution Internet online petitioner initiator, to shed light and solve the alleged human trafficking in the Philippines, prostitution in the Philippines, sexual slavery or trafficking dens in Angeles, Pampanga. Revilla re-filed Senate Bill No. 12, the "Anti Pornography Bill." In 2007, Angeles City police Chief Sonny Cunanan denied the allegations, alleging "the Women's and Children's Concerned Section (WCCS) and other agencies of the Angeles City Government that is responsible for the regular inspection of different bars and nightclubs have no records about the existence of a sex slave camp in the city." But he confirmed that "Angeles intelligence policemen, in coordination with other counterparts, were directed to look into the veracity of the report and file necessary charges against the operators of the illegal activities if these really exist."

Rape of children
The age of consent in the Philippines is 16 years old meaning that non-forcible sexual intercourse with a child 15 years and below is considered as statutory rape.

Sex trafficking

Sex trafficking in the Philippines is a significant problem. Filipina women and girls have been forced into prostitution, raped, and been physically and psychologically abused in a number of ways.

Marital rape
The Bureau of Democracy, Human Rights, and Labor of the United States Department of State in a 2006 report described the status of marital rape in the Philippines as illegal but added that enforcement is ineffective.

Rape between two persons who are parties to a marriage is acknowledged by law. The Supreme Court of the Philippines first ruled on a marital rape case in 2014 when it affirmed the 2002 decision of the Court of Appeals upholding the conviction of the Cagayan de Oro City Regional Trial Court's conviction of a man who raped his wife in two occasions in 1998. The case was filed in 1999. The high court's ruling on the case stated that sexual intercourse between spouses are rape if there was a lack of consent and that "A marriage license should not be viewed as a license for a husband to forcibly rape his wife with impunity".

Victim silence
Most female victims of gang rape remain silent for months before reporting the crime.  Obet Montes, coordinator for services of the women's group GABRIELA, says this is due to the victim’s fear of society’s judgment, of not wanting to be branded as a maruming babae. They further state that oftentimes a rape victim becomes so afraid that she is going to be blamed for the crime that she denies that she was violated.

Claire Padilla, a lawyer and advocate of women's rights who prosecuted the case of a 19-year-old who had the mental capacity of a six-year-old, says that a rape victim who keeps silent becomes easy prey for continued abuse.

Prevention

Government
The Philippine National Police (PNP) and Department of Social Welfare and Development (DSWD) both maintain help desks to assist victims of violence against women and to encourage the reporting of crimes. With the assistance of NGOs, officers received gender sensitivity training to deal with victims of sexual crimes and domestic violence. Approximately seven to eight percent of PNP officers were women. The PNP has a Women and Children's Unit to deal with these issues.

Non-governmental organizations
The women’s group GABRIELA provides counseling for battered women, rape victims and other victims of violence against women.
The Bathaluman Crisis Centre Foundation helps victims of rape and incest.
The Support Group Volunteers provide assistance, and psychological interventions may also be initiated at the centre. Where appropriate, cases are referred to other agencies for more specialist assistance.
The Women's Crisis Centre (WCC) provides temporary shelter, medical assistance and advocacy, legal assistance and advocacy, and stress management, it has two particularly innovative components – Feminist Counselling, and a Survivors Support Group to rape victims.

See also
Subic rape case
Maggie de la Riva rape case
Violence against women in the Philippines

External links
Lawphil.net, G.R. No. L-28232 February 6, 1971, People vs. Jose et al.

References

 
Law of the Philippines
Violence against women in the Philippines